Space Is the Place (released 2012 in Copenhagen, Denmark by Storyville – 101 4271) is a Contemporary Jazz album by the Danish/Norwegian Dahl/Andersen/Christensen Trio.

Review 
Carsten Dahl is credited all the compositions on this delicate album, but along the lines he has drawn there are improvised really fresh and sometimes very freely between the three coequal "moment composers". Dahl is a sound processor, and a dynamic composer with such a personal expression that it is almost incomprehensible that he is right up at the top. Arild Andersen is one that really has understood what an enormous talent Dahl is in possession of. The Norwegian super bassist has worked with Dahl for years and the two have a chemistry that is rare. It is a sublime idea to invite the inimitable Jon Christensen on drums, and the result has to come out in the upper end.

Reception 
The review of the Norwegian newspaper Dagbladet awarded the album dice 6, and the review of the Norwegian electronic newspaper Nettavisen awarded the album dice 5.

Track listing 
All compositions by Carsten Dahl
"Sing, Sing Loud" (3:42)
"Perceptions Of Time" (4:43)
"Space Is The Place" (3:53)
"Hcabbach" (5:45)
"Saturnia Pavonia" (4:08)
"Eyes Of An Owl" (2:36)
"Nariman's Mood" (5:44)
"Reflection" (0:49)
"The Wonder" (3:38)
"E-Banging" (4:15)
"Agnete's Song" (3:07)

Personnel 
Carsten Dahl - Piano & Percussion
Arild Andersen - Double bass
Jon Christensen - Drums & Kalimba

Credits 
Design – Sønder Omme
Cover drawing – Jon Christensen
Photography – Jan Persson
Recording & Mixing – Thomas Vang
Composer & producer – Carsten Dahl

Notes 
Recorded at The Village Recording, June 5, 2011.

References

External links 
Carsten Dahl Official Website
Arild Andersen Official Website

Jazz albums by Norwegian artists
2012 albums